Parasolymus is a genus of longhorn beetles of the subfamily Lamiinae, containing the following species:

 Parasolymus multiguttatus Breuning, 1949
 Parasolymus sjostedti Breuning, 1934

References

Tragocephalini
Cerambycidae genera